Cheh Kan is a town and union council in Dera Ismail Khan District of Khyber-Pakhtunkhwa in Pakistan.

References

Union councils of Dera Ismail Khan District
Populated places in Dera Ismail Khan District